Chad Brock is the eponymous debut studio album of country music artist Chad Brock. Released in 1998 (see 1998 in country music) on Warner Bros. Records Nashville, the album produced three chart singles for Brock on the Billboard country charts between 1998 and 1999. In order of release, these were "Ordinary Life" (#3), "Lightning Does the Work" (#19) and "Evangeline" (#51). "Evangeline" was covered by Sammy Kershaw on his 2006 album Honky Tonk Boots, which was also produced by Buddy Cannon and Norro Wilson. "You Made a Liar Out of Me" was co-written by Rich Alves of Pirates of the Mississippi.

Track listing

Personnel
From Chad Brock liner notes.
Musicians
 Eddie Bayers – drums (except 7)
 Chad Brock – lead vocals (all tracks), background vocals (3)
 Larry Byrom – acoustic guitar (all tracks)
 Jim Chapman – background vocals (1, 8)
 J. T. Corenflos – electric guitar (all tracks), 12-string guitar (4), acoustic guitar (4)
 Glen Duncan – fiddle (7)
 Larry Franklin – fiddle (1, 3, 4, 8)
 Paul Franklin – steel guitar (7)
 Sonny Garrish – steel guitar (except 7)
 Rob Hajacos – fiddle (2, 5, 6, 9, 10)
 John Hobbs – piano, synthesizer (2, 5)
 David Hungate – bass guitar (7)
 Rodger Morris – synthesizer (1, 3, 4)
 Larry Paxton – bass guitar (except 7)
 Brent Rowan – electric guitar (7)
 John Wesley Ryles – background vocals (2, 6, 7, 9)
 Dawn Sears – background vocals (10)
 Cindy Richardson-Walker – background vocals (1, 3, 4, 5, 7, 8)
 Bergen White – background vocals (5, 10)
 Dennis Wilson – background vocals (2, 6, 9)
 Lonnie Wilson – drums (7)
 Curtis Young – background vocals (1, 3, 4, 5, 8, 10)
 Reggie Young – electric guitar (6)

Additional vocals on "Evangeline": Buddy Cannon, Susan Marshall-Clinton, Dillon Dixon, Adam Hughes, Lesa Reneé, Melonie Cannon-Richardson, Ray Scott, Norro Wilson

Technical
 Chris Lord-Alge – mixing
 Terry Bates – engineering
 Kevin Beamish – engineering
 Bob Bullock – engineering
 Buddy Cannon – production
 Billy Sherrill – engineering
 Hank Williams – mastering
 Norro Wilson – production

Chart performance

Singles

References

External links
[ Chad Brock] at Allmusic

1998 debut albums
Chad Brock albums
Warner Records albums
Albums produced by Norro Wilson
Albums produced by Buddy Cannon